Calibre 38 is a 1919 existing American silent Western film produced by and directed by Edgar Lewis. It is preserved in the Library of Congress.

Cast
 Mitchell Lewis as Austin Brandt
 Hedda Nova as Joan
 Victor Sutherland as Ford Barton
 Lola Pauzdrovna as Myrtle
 William A. Williams as Barton, Capitalist
 Edward Roseman as Royce Greer (* as Edward F. Roseman)
 William Cavanaugh as Sure Shot Jessup (* as William H. Cavanaugh)
 Mary Carr as Rosemary (* as Mary Kennevean Carr)

References

External links
 
 

1919 films
1919 Western (genre) films
American black-and-white films
Films based on short fiction
Silent American Western (genre) films
Films directed by Edgar Lewis
1910s American films
1910s English-language films